KAPB-FM (97.7 FM) is an American radio station broadcasting a 1990s-based classic country format. Licensed to Marksville, Louisiana, United States, the station is currently owned by Bontemps Media Services LLC.  Station was associated with KAPB-AM 1370KHZ.

History
The station was assigned the call letters KWLB-FM on 1980-08-01.  On 1987-06-25, the station changed its call sign to the current KAPB-FM.

The initials "KAPB" stand for Know Avoyelles Parish Better. KAPB tweaked format to 1990s-based classic country along with Louisiana Legends on May 1, 2017.  The station has a program called the "Swap Shop" formerly the "Trading Post" where callers can call in and sell, swap, or give away items.
The Cajun airs The Saturday Morning Get Together with Pat Tassin from 6-12PM highlighting Louisiana Swamp Pop, Zydeco and Cajun music.  The Cajun also airs The Classic Pig Roast, playing earlier classics from the 1950s to the 1980s from 12-4 Saturdays and 12-3 Sundays.

References

External links

Radio stations in Louisiana
Classic country radio stations in the United States
Marksville, Louisiana